High Frontier may refer to:

The High Frontier, a 1976 book about space colonization by Gerard K. O'Neill
High Frontier, Inc., an American think tank established in the 1980s by former Lieutenant General Daniel O. Graham
High Frontier (video game), a 1987 video game by ZX Spectrum games
High Frontier (board game), a 2010 board wargame by Sierra Madre

The High Frontier (album), 2013 album by American band Lumerians

See also
High Frontiers, former name of Mondo 2000, American magazine